Pascoal Moreira Cabral Leme (born 1654 in Sorocaba, died 1730 in Cuiabá) was a bandeirante who operated in the central region of South America. He found gold at the site which became the city of Cuiabá.

Gold

In 1719 he was camped near the settlement of São Gonçalo, when he found gold at the shore of the Coxipó-Mirim creek in the modern State of Mato Grosso. That day, April 8, is considered to be the day that Cuiabá was founded. The city's foundation, as Leme states himself, was to ensure the appropriation of the land and gold fields for the Portuguese Crown, although that land was technically the property of the Spanish Crown according to the Treaty of Tordesillas.

See also
Genealogia Paulistana, by Luiz Gonzaga da Silva Leme. São Paulo, Duprat & Co., 1903-05 (9 volumes). Vol. VII, pg. 433 on.

References

1654 births
1730 deaths
People from Sorocaba